Jenna Bartholemew (born 10 August 1988) is a South African born Canadian woman cricketer. She made her international debut for Canada at the 2013 ICC Women's World Twenty20 Qualifier.

References

External links 
 

1988 births
Living people
Canadian women cricketers
Canadian people of South African descent